Grachan Moncur II (sometimes credited as Grachan Moncur, born September 2, 1915 – November 3, 1996) was an American jazz bassist with the Savoy Sultans.

Early life 
Moncur was a multi-instrumentalist as a teenager, learning trombone, tuba, and double bass while growing up in Miami.

Career 
After moving to Newark, New Jersey, Moncur began playing bass on a local radio station, where John Hammond heard him. Hammond brought Moncur in for studio sessions in 1935–36 with Mildred Bailey, Bunny Berigan, Putney Dandridge, Bud Freeman, and Teddy Wilson. He was a founding member of the Savoy Sultans, playing with the group until 1945. Later in the 1940s, he worked with Ike Quebec and Ace Harris. His discography roster also showed he played sessions with baritone and bass saxophones in various 1930s and 1940s recordings.

Moncur returned to Miami in the 1950s, where he remained active until late in the 1960s.

Personal life 
Moncur was the half-brother of Al Cooper and the father of jazz trombonist Grachan Moncur III.

References

External links
 

1915 births
1996 deaths
20th-century African-American musicians
American people of Bahamian descent
American jazz double-bassists
Male double-bassists
Musicians from Miami
20th-century double-bassists
20th-century American male musicians
American male jazz musicians
Savoy Sultans members